An election to Hertfordshire County Council took place on 2 May 2013, as part of the 2013 United Kingdom local elections. 77 electoral divisions elected one county councilor each by first-past-the-post voting for a four-year term of office. The electoral divisions were the same as those used at the previous election in 2009.

All locally registered electors (British, Irish, Commonwealth and European Union citizens) who were aged 18 or over on Thursday 2 May 2013, were entitled to vote in the local elections. Those who were temporarily away from their ordinary address (for example, away working, on holiday, in student accommodation or in hospital) were also entitled to vote in the local elections, although those who had moved abroad and registered as overseas electors cannot vote in the local elections. It is possible to register to vote at more than one address (such as a university student who had a term-time address and lives at home during holidays) at the discretion of the local Electoral Register Office, but it remains an offence to vote more than once in the same local government election.

Summary
The Conservative Party retained overall control of the council with a reduced majority of 15 seats, having lost a net total of 9 seats. The Liberal Democrats remained the council's official opposition with 16 seats, while the Labour Party won a larger proportion of votes to win 15 seats, a net gain of 12. UKIP were unsuccessful in their challenge for seats, despite making breakthroughs in surrounding counties. The Green Party and British National Party both lost their solitary councilors, finishing second and fourth in those two divisions respectively.

All seats in the east of the county returned Conservative councilors, whereas in Stevenage and Watford no Conservative candidates succeeded in winning a seat. Labour's main area of success was Stevenage where its candidates (some ex-councilors) regained a dominant position at the expense of the Conservatives, but their lack of success in Hemel Hempstead will have been a disappointment in a former stronghold. Labour picked up two gains in mid-density divisions in Watford and Letchworth.  Liberal Democrat support held up well in Tring, but saw a greater collapse in those broad areas without any local incumbency such as East Hertfordshire (10 divisions). However, their net loss of one councilor was smaller than in most other parts of England.

Candidates
Labour and Conservative parties contested every electoral division and finished bottom of individual polls in a small minority of divisions, 11 and one respectively. UKIP had no candidate in six divisions and the Liberal Democrats fielded no candidate in three. After the four main parties, the Green Party fielded the next highest number of candidates at 37, just over half of the Council divisions.

Election results

Results by district 
The above results can be broken down by district, although these are not current compositions of the district councils whose elections are held in other years.

Results by electoral division

Broxbourne (6 seats)

Dacorum (10 seats)

East Herts (10 seats)

Hertsmere (7 seats)

North Herts (9 seats)

St Albans (10 seats)

Stevenage (6 seats)

Three Rivers (6 seats)

Watford (6 seats)

Welwyn Hatfield (7 seats)

References
Unless otherwise stated, information has been taken from Hertfordshire County Council election pages

2013 English local elections
2013
2010s in Hertfordshire